Mexichelys is an extinct monotypic genus of sea turtle which lived in Mexico during the Cretaceous. The only species is Mexichelys coahuilaensis. Mexichelys was erected in 2010 as a replacement name for Euclastes coahuilaensis, a species named in 2009.

Cladogram based on Lynch and Parham (2003) and Parham and Pyenson (2010):

References

External links
 Mexichelys in the Paleobiology Database

Late Cretaceous turtles of North America
Cheloniidae
Fossil taxa described in 2010
Fossils of Mexico
Prehistoric turtle genera
Extinct turtles
Monotypic prehistoric reptile genera